Anthony Mason may refer to:

 Anthony Mason (basketball) (1966–2015), American basketball player
 Sir Anthony Mason (judge) (born 1925), former Chief Justice of Australia
 Anthony Mason (journalist) (born 1956), news correspondent and anchor

See also
 Tony Mason (disambiguation)